George Loane Tucker (June 12, 1872 – June 20, 1921) was an American actor, silent film director, screenwriter, producer, and editor.

Career
Tucker was born George S. Loane in Chicago to George Loane and stage actress Ethel Tucker. After graduating from the University of Chicago, he got a job as a railroad clerk. He was chief clerk for the Maintenance of Way. Tucker was later the youngest man to be promoted to Contracting Freight Agent. After his first wife died while giving birth to the couple's son, Tucker quit his job. On the advice of friends, he began acting in stage productions.

By the mid-1910s, films were becoming a more popular draw for audiences which led Tucker to film acting and scenario writing. In 1911, he wrote a script for the short drama film Their First Misunderstanding. The film, which starred Mary Pickford, was a surprise hit.

Over the course of his career, Tucker directed 69 films, 19 of which he also wrote. In 1913 he directed Traffic in Souls, which concerned the topic of white slavery. The film was an enormous hit (it made over a million dollars in profit) and remains an early influential example of realism in early cinema. Traffic in Souls served to establish Tucker as a respected director and writer. Shortly after the film was released, he moved to England where he hired as the Director-general for the London Film Company. It was there that Tucker met and married his second wife, British actress Elisabeth Risdon. While living in England, Tucker directed and produced several films for London Film including The Manxman (1917). An adaptation of the 1894 novel of the same name, it was one of the few British films that was distributed in the United States and would go on to become a financial and critical success.

In late 1916, Tucker returned to the United States in where he was hired as the Director-general for Goldwyn Pictures. That year, he wrote and directed The Cinderella Man which became that year's most profitable film. The following year, Tucker wrote and directed another hit, Virtuous Wives, starring Anita Stewart. In 1919, Tucker wrote, produced and directed what became his most well known and financially successful film, The Miracle Man. The film featured Lon Chaney in a breakout role as a man who pretends to be handicapped. The Miracle Man was a critical and financial success (some critics called it "the greatest picture ever made") and made the film's stars, Chaney and Thomas Meighan, established stars. Shortly before his death, Tucker completed direction on the drama Ladies Must Live. The film was released in October 1921, approximately four months after his death.

Death
On June 20, 1921, Tucker died after a year long illness at his home in Los Angeles at the age of 49. He was survived by his wife, actress Elisabeth Risdon. Tucker is buried at Hollywood Forever Cemetery.

Selected filmography

References

References

External links

 
 
 Portrait of Tucker on lantern slide of Ladies Must Live (1921)
 

1872 births
1921 deaths
20th-century American male actors
American expatriates in England
American film directors
Film producers from Illinois
American male musical theatre actors
American male screenwriters
American male silent film actors
American male stage actors
Burials at Hollywood Forever Cemetery
Male actors from Chicago
Silent film directors
University of Chicago alumni
Writers from Chicago
Screenwriters from Illinois
American film editors
20th-century American male writers
20th-century American screenwriters